This is a list of the National Register of Historic Places listings in Grand Teton National Park.

This is intended to be a complete list of the properties and districts on the National Register of Historic Places in Grand Teton National Park, Wyoming, United States.  The locations of National Register properties and districts for which the latitude and longitude coordinates are included below, may be seen in a Google map.

There are 36 properties and districts listed on the National Register in the park, two of which are National Historic Landmarks.

Current listings

|}

See also 
 National Register of Historic Places listings in Teton County, Wyoming
 List of National Historic Landmarks in Wyoming
 National Register of Historic Places listings in Wyoming

References 
Culpin, Mary Shivers. National Register of Historic Places Multiple Property Documentation Form: Grand Teton National Park Multiple Property Submission. National Park Service 1995

External links